This is a list of countries by natural gas exports  mostly based on The World Factbook . For informational purposes several non-sovereign entities are also included in this list.

*

See too 
 List of countries by natural gas exports
 List of countries by natural gas imports
 List of countries by natural gas consumption
 List of countries by natural gas proven reserves
 List of natural gas fields
 Giant oil and gas fields

References

Natural gas exports
 Exports
Lists of countries by product exports